Brewster Islands Military Reservation was a coastal defense site located on Great Brewster Island and Outer Brewster Island in Boston Harbor, Massachusetts as part of the Harbor Defenses of Boston.

History
Outer Brewster Island was acquired by the US government in 1913, followed by Great Brewster Island in 1917. In 1920 there was a proposal to build a naval-type turret with two 16-inch guns on Great Brewster Island, but this was not implemented. Calf Island Military Reservation was also considered, but the battery was finally built (without a turret) as Fort Duvall. The Brewster Islands Military Reservation was built in World War II on these islands. Its mission was to protect Boston Harbor from possible air and naval attack. It never fired its guns, but it did play an important part in the defense of the harbor.

Great Brewster Island
This island had an observation post and mine casemate for controlling a minefield in the harbor. The island also had an Anti-Motor Torpedo Boat Battery (AMTB), called AMTB 942. This AMTB battery had an authorized strength of four 90 mm guns, two on fixed mounts and two on towed mounts, as well as two towed 37 mm guns. The facility on Great Brewster Island may have been renamed Camp Prescott in 1943.

Outer Brewster Island
This island had a battery of two 6-inch M1 guns on long-range shielded carriages, with a large magazine and fire control bunker between them. The battery was initially called Battery 209, but later named Battery Jewell. A fire control tower and an SCR-296 radar were also on the island.

Present
The site today consists of the foundations of buildings and gun mounts, and the bunker of Battery Jewell.

See also
 Seacoast defense in the United States
 United States Army Coast Artillery Corps
 List of military installations in Massachusetts

References

External links
 Island Facts: Great Brewster Island at NPS.gov
 List of all US coastal forts and batteries at the Coast Defense Study Group, Inc. website
 FortWiki, lists most CONUS and Canadian forts
 Harbor Defenses of Boston at American Forts Network

Military in Boston
Buildings and structures in Boston
Installations of the U.S. Army in Massachusetts
Boston Harbor islands